Zagóry may refer to:
Zagóry, Lesser Poland Voivodeship (south Poland)
Zagóry, Łódź Voivodeship (central Poland)
Zagóry, Polish name for Žagarė, Lithuania